Georg Karl Friedrich Kunowsky (3 March 1786 –23 December 1846) was a German lawyer who was also a talented amateur astronomer.

He made observations of Mars with an 11 cm achromatic refractor telescope made by Joseph von Fraunhofer, which was one of the first times that achromatic refractors were used for planetary observation; these were a notable improvement over the reflectors available to earlier observers.

Like William Herschel before him, he came to the correct conclusion that the visible patches on Mars were surface features rather than clouds or other transient features. Observers like Johann Hieronymus Schröter had come to the opposite conclusion.

He also made observations of the Moon, and was one of a number of astronomers to independently discover the return of Comet Halley in 1835.

Kunowsky crater on the Moon and another crater on Mars were named in his honour.

1786 births
1846 deaths
19th-century German astronomers